The Alien Condition is an anthology of science fiction short stories edited by American writer Stephen Goldin and published in 1973 by Ballantine Books.

Stories 
"Lament of the Keeku Bird" by Kathleen Sky
"Wings" by Vonda N. McIntyre
"The Empire of T'ang Lang" by Alan Dean Foster
"A Way Out" by Miriam Allen deFord
"Gee, Isn't He the Cutest Little Thing?" by Arthur Byron Cover
"Deaf Listener" by Rachel Cosgrove Payes
"Nor Iron Bars a Cage" by C.F. Hensel and Stephen Goldin
"Routine Patrol Activity" by Thomas Pickens
"Call from Kerlyana" by Alice Laurance and William K. Carlson
"The Safety Engineer" by William E. Cochrane, writing as S. Kye Boult
"Love Is the Plan the Plan Is Death" by James Tiptree Jr.
"The Latest from Sigma Corvi" by Edward Wellen

References

1973 anthologies
Science fiction anthologies
Ballantine Books books